Tyler Randell (born 31 August 1992) is an Australian professional rugby league footballer who plays as a . 

He previously played for the Newcastle Knights in the NRL and for Wakefield Trinity in the Super League.

Background
Randell was born in Scone, New South Wales, Australia.

He played his junior football for the Scone Thoroughbreds before switching to the Aberdeen Tigers, before being signed by the Newcastle Knights.

In 2012, Randell changed his surname from Sullivan to Randell.

Playing career

Early career
From 2009 to 2012, Randell played for the Newcastle Knights' NYC team. In May 2012, he re-signed with the Knights on a 3-year contract. 

In 2013, he moved on to the Knights' New South Wales Cup team.

2014
In 2014, he played for the New South Wales Residents team against the Queensland Residents.

In Round 25 of the 2014 NRL season, Randell made his NRL debut for the Knights against the Parramatta Eels. On 21 September 2014, he was named on the interchange bench in the 2014 New South Wales Cup Team of the Year.

2015
On 6 March 2015, Randell re-signed with the Knights on a 2-year contract.

2016
In February, Randell co-captained the Knights in the 2016 NRL Auckland Nines.

2017
In July, he signed a 2-year contract with Super League side Wakefield Trinity, starting in 2018, however in August, he was allowed to join Wakefield early after being granted a release by the Knights.

References

External links
Wakefield Trinity profile
Newcastle Knights profile
SL profile

1992 births
Living people
Australian rugby league players
Cessnock Goannas players
Newcastle Knights players
Rugby league five-eighths
Rugby league halfbacks
Rugby league hookers
Rugby league locks
Rugby league players from Scone, New South Wales
Wakefield Trinity players